Gustaf Adolf Bredenberg (10 August 1865, Bromarf - 21 February 1955) was a Finnish agronomist and politician. He was a member of the Parliament of Finland from 1913 to 1916, representing the Swedish People's Party of Finland (SFP).

References

1865 births
1955 deaths
People from Raseborg
People from Uusimaa Province (Grand Duchy of Finland)
Swedish People's Party of Finland politicians
Members of the Parliament of Finland (1913–16)
University of Helsinki alumni
Academic staff of the University of Helsinki